Anithya is a 2013 Sri Lankan Sinhala romantic film directed and produced by Nalaka Vithanage for Cinosis Vision productions along with Nuwan Weliwita, Kosala Tantula, Chinthaka Ranaweera and Haren Nagodawithana. It stars Manik Wijewardena, Vishwa Lanka and Kishani Alanki in lead roles along with Udith Abeyrathne and Sangeetha Weeraratne. Music co-composed by Buddika Sri Kahawala and Madushan Fonseka. It is the 1186th Sri Lankan film in the Sinhala cinema.

Cast
 Vishwa Lanka as Milan
 Manik Wijewardena as Kaushi
 Kishani Alanki as Chethana
 Udith Abeyrathne as Imran
 Sangeetha Weeraratne as Sherine
 Roger Seneviratne as Derrick
 Bandula Vithanage as Milan's father
 Gunawardana Hettiarachchi as Chethana's father
 Milinda Madugalla as Psychopath
 Aruni Kodithuwakku as Anushka
 Thilini Priyanvada as Nurse

Soundtrack

References

2013 films
2010s Sinhala-language films